De re aedificatoria (On the Art of Building) is a classic architectural treatise written by Leon Battista Alberti between 1443 and 1452. Although largely dependent on Vitruvius's De architectura, it was the first theoretical book on the subject written in the Italian Renaissance, and in 1485 it became the first printed book on architecture.  It was followed in 1486 with the first printed edition of Vitruvius.

Book

Alberti's Ten Books consciously echoes Vitruvius's writing, but Alberti also adopts a critical attitude toward his predecessor. In his discussion, Alberti includes a wide variety of literary sources, including Plato and Aristotle, presenting a concise version of the sociology of architecture. De re aedificatoria is subdivided into ten books and includes:

 Book One: Lineaments
 Book Two: Materials
 Book Three: Construction
 Book Four: Public Works
 Book Five: Works of Individuals
 Book Six: Ornament
 Book Seven: Ornament to Sacred Buildings
 Book Eight: Ornament to Public Secular Buildings
 Book Nine: Ornament to Private Buildings
 Book Ten: Restoration of Buildings

In his survey of desirable floor plans for sacred buildings – "temples" in his phrase—Alberti begins with the ideal form of the circle, which is expressed in numerous examples of Nature. Nine ideal centrally– planned geometrical shapes are recommended for churches; besides the circle he lists the square, the hexagon, octagon, decagon, and dodecagon, all derived from the circle, and, derived from the square, rectangles that exhibit the square and a half, square and a third and double square, all of which have enharmonic parallels in music. Chapels add  small geometric figures to the basic circles and polygons to give a great variety of floor plans, in which each geometrical figure retains its clear unity and simple ratios that bind all elements of the plans and elevations into a harmonic unity.

De re aedificatoria remained the classic treatise on architecture from the 16th until the 18th century.

Book Nine
In Book Nine, Alberti presents his comments about aesthetic theory and beauty which Borsi summarizes on page 234 of his Alberti book stating: "In short, what are the elements that constitute beauty? (Or what elements derive from each particular kind of beauty?) The question is a difficult one." Quoting Alberti, Borsi presents Alberti as stating: "For whatever that property be which is chosen from the whole number and nature of the several parts or attributed to each of them in precise and equal measure, or which must be such as to form a single entity of organism out of a number of parts, binding them together in a just, stable and harmonious manner... it must certainly contain within itself the value, I would almost say the essence of all the above-mentioned parts with which it is connected or which it compenetrates. Otherwise they would clash and the beauty of the whole be lost. This enquiry and selection is in itself far from easy or obvious. But it is particularly hazardous and difficult in the field we have chosen to enquire into, for architecture consists of so many various parts, and each of these parts requires so many different ornaments, as we have already seen."

For Borsi, Alberti is deriving his viewpoint from the Enneads by Plotinus.

See also
De pictura
De architectura
I quattro libri dell'architettura

Notes

References
 Alberti, Leon Battista. De re aedificatoria. On the art of building in ten books. (translated by Joseph Rykwert, Robert Tavernor and Neil Leach). Cambridge, Massachusetts: MIT Press, 1988.
 Grafton, Anthony. Leon Battista Alberti: master builder of the Italian Renaissance. New York: Hill and Wang, 2000.
 Tavernor, Robert. On Alberti and the Art of Building. New Haven and London: Yale University Press, 1998.
 Wittkower, Rudolph. Architectural Principles in the Age of Humanism (London: Tiranti) 1962; (New York: Random House) 1965. Part I.i "Alberti's Program of the Ideal Church"; part ii "Alberti's Approach to Antiquity in Architecture"; part IV.iii "Alberti's 'Generation' of Ratios".
 Fontana-Giusti, Gordana. 'Walling and the city: the effects of walls and walling within the city space', The Journal of Architecture pp 309–45 Volume 16, Issue 3, London & New York: Routledge, 2011 http://www.tandfonline.com/toc/rjar20/16/3#.UlGA8ChTNUQ

External links
Ten Books on Architecture by Leone Battista Alberti
Latin, French and Italian editions of De re aedificatoria

1485 books
Architectural treatises
15th-century Latin books
Renaissance architecture
Works by Leon Battista Alberti